The New York Codes, Rules and Regulations (NYCRR) contains New York state rules and regulations. The NYCRR is officially compiled by the New York State Department of State's Division of Administrative Rules.

Contents

See also
 New York State Register
 Rules of New York City
 Law of New York
 Code of Federal Regulations

References

External links
 New York Codes, Rules and Regulations from West
 New York Codes, Rules and Regulations from the New York Secretary of State

New York (state) law
New York